Massimo Zedda (born 6 January 1976) is an Italian politician, Mayor of Cagliari from 2011 to 2019.

Biography 
Son of a Sardinian leader of the Italian Communist Party, Zedda joined Nichi Vendola's Left Ecology Freedom in 2009.

In 2011, Zedda became the centre-left candidate for the office of Mayor of Cagliari at the 2011 local elections, supported by his party, the Democratic Party, Italy of Values and the Federation of the Left; he manages to be elected at the second round.

In 2016, Zedda runs once again for Mayor at the local elections supported by the whole centre-left coalition and is re-elected at the first round. In 2017, Zedda supported Giuliano Pisapia's Progressive Camp project and later joined the left-wing party Progressive Area.

In 2018, Zedda decided to run for the office of President of Sardinia at the 2019 regional election, guiding a centre-left coalition named Sardinian Progressives.

References 

1976 births
Living people
20th-century Italian politicians
21st-century Italian politicians
Mayors of Cagliari
People from Cagliari
Left Ecology Freedom politicians